The 1900 Los Angeles Mayoral election Mayor of Los Angeles took place on December 3, 1900. Meredith P. Snyder was elected.

Results

References

External links
 Office of the City Clerk, City of Los Angeles

1900
1900 California elections
Los Angeles
1900s in Los Angeles